Fun Khana is a Pakistani sitcom directed by Saqib Khan, produced by Momina Duraid, and written by Saqib Khan, Babar Jamal, and Mansoor Saeed. It was broadcast on Hum TV.

Cast 
 Hina Dilpazeer as Kausar (Head of the Ahmad family)
 Uroosa Siddiqui as Warda Ahmad
 Behroze Sabzwari as Qizalbash Ahmad
 Firdous Jamal as Rustam Ahmad
 Gohar Rasheed as Mustaqeem Ahmad

See also
 Halka Na Lo
 Extras (The Mango People)

References

External links 
 

2012 Pakistani television series debuts
Urdu-language television shows
Pakistani television sitcoms
Hum TV original programming
2012 Pakistani television series endings